Erythronium howellii, or Howell's fawn lily, is a flowering bulb in the lily family endemic to northwestern California and southwestern Oregon.

It has been reclassified by the Jepson Manual as Erythronium citrinum  var. citrinum.

Distribution
It is found in the Klamath Mountains and northern Outer California Coast Ranges.

There are small populations in Siskiyou, Trinity, and Del Norte Counties in northern California; and in Curry, Josephine, and Jackson Counties in Oregon. It is listed as vulnerable for the following reasons: "Range is Del Norte Co., Calif., and adjacent southern Oregon. Most of the populations occur in Oregon, a few in California. Oregon sites number <38. Populations are not large, many reported during pre-timber harvest surveys."

References

External links
  Calflora Database: Erythronium howellii (Howell's fawn lily,)
  USDA Plants Profile for Erythronium howellii (Howell's fawnlily)
  UC CalPhotos gallery of Erythronium citrinum  var. citrinum — formerly Erythronium howellii.

howellii
Flora of Oregon
Flora of California
Flora of the Klamath Mountains
Endemic flora of the United States
Natural history of the California chaparral and woodlands
Natural history of the California Coast Ranges
Taxa named by Sereno Watson